Isaac Surienarine (born 16 December 1946) is a Guyanese cricketer. He played in four first-class matches for Guyana from 1968 to 1976.

See also
 List of Guyanese representative cricketers

References

External links
 

1946 births
Living people
Guyanese cricketers
Guyana cricketers